The 2016–17 season was Rotherham United's 92nd season in their existence and their third consecutive season in the Championship. In the previous season, Rotherham secured their place in the championship with a 21st-placed finish, 9 points above the relegation zone. Along with competing in the Championship, the club also participated in the FA Cup, in which they entered in the third round, and the EFL Cup.

Key events
On 1 June 2016, Rotherham appointed Alan Stubbs as manager, with John Doolan joining him as assistant manager. Both signed three-year contracts with the Millers. Two days later, the club announced the departure of first team coach Nicky Eaden.

On 30 June 2016, Andy Holden was appointed as first team coach. Holden had previously worked with Stubbs at Hibernian.

On 19 October 2016 the club announced the departure of Stubbs, Doolan and Holden with immediate effect.

Kenny Jackett was named manager on 21 October 2016, signing a three-year deal. On 28 November, 39 days later and after only 5 games in charge, he resigned. Paul Warne took over as interim manager.

On 12 January 2017, the club changed goalkeeping coach, with Andy Dibble leaving for Cardiff and Mike Pollitt returning to the club for a third time to replace him.

Rotherham became the first side in the top six tiers of English football to be relegated in the 2016–17 season on 1 April, after losing 1–0 at home to Fulham.

On 5 April 2017, the club formally appointed Paul Warne as manager, on a one-year rolling contract.

Squad statistics

Player statistics
 
Players with zero appearances have been unused substitutes in one or more games.

Goalscorers

Pre-season friendlies
Source:

Competitions

Championship

League table

Results summary

Matchday summary

Results

FA Cup

On 5 December 2016, the third round draw for the EFL Cup was made.

EFL Cup

On 22 June 2016, the first round draw for the EFL Cup was made.

Transfers

Transfers in

Transfers out

Loans in

Loans out

References

Rotherham United
Rotherham United F.C. seasons